Charles Hutchinson may refer to:

 Charles Hutchinson (Nottingham MP) (1636–1695), English politician, Member of Parliament (MP) for Nottingham
 Charles Frederick Hutchinson (1850–1907), English physician and MP for Rye
 Charles L. Hutchinson (1854–1924), Chicago business leader and philanthropist
 Charles Scrope Hutchinson (1826–1912), UK Chief Inspecting Officer for Railways

See also
Charles Hutchison (1879–1949), American film actor, director and screenwriter
Charles W. Hutchison (1865–1945), Wisconsin politician